Karl Andersson i Eliantorp  (10 August 1869 – 29 October 1959) was a Swedish politician. He was a member of the Centre Party.

1869 births
1959 deaths
People from Finspång Municipality
Centre Party (Sweden) politicians
Members of the Första kammaren